Bank, Azerbaijan may refer to:
 Bankə, Azerbaijan
 Promysel Narimanova, Azerbaijan 
 Vəng (disambiguation), several places in Azerbaijan